Danijela Kristina Rundqvist (born 26 September 1984) is a Swedish retired ice hockey player and three time Olympian with the Swedish national ice hockey team.

Playing career
Rundqvist plays hockey at the forward position. She was trained in Kälvesta SK. In 2001, she joined AIK IF. Historically, the club won national championships in 2004, 2007 and 2009, as well as the IIHF European Women's Champions Cup in 2005, 2006, 2007, and 2008.

Of note, she is a member of the Sweden women's national ice hockey team. She won a silver medal at the 2006 Winter Olympics and a bronze medal at the 2002 Winter Olympics.

In 2010, she was chosen in the 13th position during the 2010 CWHL Draft of Canadian Women's Hockey League. Rundqvist left her native Sweden to compete for Burlington Barracudas, based in Ontario, Canada.

In 2011–12, Rundqvist played with Team Sweden teammates Elin Holmlov and Kim Martin for Moscow Tornado of the Russian Professional Women's League.

Career stats

Personal
Danijela has a younger sister, Sandra, and a younger brother Alexander. She is half Serbian; her mother is a Kosovo Serb.

See also
 Sweden women's national ice hockey team

References

External links

 
 
 Burlington Barracudas profile
 Danijela Rundqvist Blog

News
 "Swede success for Barracudas’ Danijela Rundqvist", Burlington Post, 18 February 2011.
 "Swede impresses in CWHL: Rundqvist joins new Canadian women's hockey league", IIHF, 7 March 2011.
 "My life in Canada", Swedish Television
 SVT report, Swedish Television

1984 births
Living people
AIK Hockey Dam players
Burlington Barracudas players
Djurgårdens IF Hockey Dam players
Ice hockey players at the 2002 Winter Olympics
Ice hockey players at the 2006 Winter Olympics
Ice hockey players at the 2010 Winter Olympics
Medalists at the 2002 Winter Olympics
Medalists at the 2006 Winter Olympics
Olympic bronze medalists for Sweden
Olympic ice hockey players of Sweden
Olympic medalists in ice hockey
Olympic silver medalists for Sweden
SDE Hockey players
Ice hockey people from Stockholm
Swedish women's ice hockey forwards
Swedish people of Serbian descent
HC Tornado players